Honoré Vlamynck (29 January 1897 – 1 September 1974) was a Belgian professional footballer, best remembered for his 13 year career as a forward in the Belgian First Division with R. Daring Club Molenbeek. He scored three goals in four appearances for Belgium at international level. Vlamynck guested for English club Leicester Fosse during the First World War.

Personal life 
Vlamynck served in the Belgian Army during the early months of the First World War and was wounded during the Battle of the Frontiers. He convalesced from his injuries in Leicester, England.

Honours 
R. Daring Club Molenbeek
 Belgian First Division: 1920–21

Individual

 Belgian First Division top scorer: 1919–20

References

External links
 

1897 births
Belgian Army personnel
Belgian footballers
Leicester City F.C. wartime guest players
R. Daring Club Molenbeek players
K.V. Oostende players
Association football forwards
Sportspeople from Ostend
Footballers from West Flanders
Belgian Pro League players
Belgium international footballers
1974 deaths
Belgian military personnel of World War I